Cacotherapia nigrocinereella is a species of snout moth in the genus Cacotherapia. It was described by George Duryea Hulst in 1900 and is known from the US state of Texas.

References

Cacotherapiini
Moths described in 1900